Must B 21 is the second studio album released by the Black Eyed Peas frontman will.i.am. The album was released on September 23, 2003.

Background
The album was released on September 23, 2003, and boasts a multitude of guest artists, including KRS-One, Phife Dawg, MC Supernatural, Planet Asia, FLII, John Legend, MC Lyte, Phil Da Agony and Tash, as well as fellow Black Eyed Peas Fergie and Taboo. The album itself is a collection of material recorded by Adams during the creation of the Black Eyed Peas album Elephunk. The project marked Adams' last release as a solo artist for over four years, until his third album Songs About Girls was released in late 2007. The album was originally only available on vinyl, but a CD and digital release followed in December 2003. Track seventeen on the release, "Go!", was used in the video games NBA Live 2005 and Madden NFL 2005. A video for the track was also recorded for use within the games; however, no official singles were released from the album. The artwork for the album was designed by Shepard Fairey.

Track listing

References

2003 albums
Will.i.am albums
Albums with cover art by Shepard Fairey
Albums produced by will.i.am